The UC Davis Aggies football team represents the University of California, Davis in NCAA Division I Football Championship Subdivision (FCS). The football program's first season took place in 1915, and has fielded a team each year since with the exception of 1918 during World War I and from 1943 to 1945 during World War II, when the campus, then known as the University Farm, was shut down. The team was known as the Cal Aggies or California Aggies from 1922 to 1958 when UC Davis was called the Northern Branch of the College of Agriculture.

UC Davis competed as a member of the NCAA College Division through 1972; from 1973 to 2003, the Aggies competed as an NCAA Division II program. In 2004, UC Davis promoted its football program to the Division I FCS (then I-AA) level and joined the Great West Conference (then known as the Great West Football Conference) after one season as an independent team with exploratory status. After their provisional seasons and the construction of a new stadium, UC Davis became a full member of Division I in 2007 and eligible for the postseason.

Throughout its history, the football program won 31 conference championships. Between 1929 and 1992, the Aggies captured 27 outright or shared Northern California Athletic Conference championships, including 20 in a row from 1971 to 1990, an American West Conference title in 1993 (co-champion), and GWFC/GWC championships in 2005 (co-champ) and 2009.

The Aggies won their first conference title as a Division I program in 2018 as one of the Big Sky Conference's three regular-season champions.

Conference affiliations
UC Davis has been both independent and affiliated with multiple conferences.
 NCAA Independent (1915–1924)
 Northern California Athletic Conference (1925–1992)
 Far Western Conference (1925–1981)
 Northern California Athletic Conference (1982–1992)
 American West Conference (1993)
 NCAA Division II Independent (1994–2002)
 NCAA Division I-AA Independent (2003)
 Great West Football Conference (2004–2011)
 Big Sky Conference (2012–present)

Conference championships
UC Davis Aggies football program has won or shared a total of 31 conference championships since 1915, including 27 from the Northern California Athletic Conference where they won 20 straight conference champions from 1971 to 1990.

† Co-champion

Playoff records

NCAA Division I-AA/FCS
The Aggies have appeared twice in the Division I FCS playoffs. Their combined playoff record is 1–2.

NCAA Division II
The Aggies appeared in eighteen times in the NCAA Division II playoffs from 1977 through 2002. Their playoff record was 15–18.

Bowl games

Home stadiums
1915-1924
Various Fields -Davis, CA and Sacramento, Ca

1925-1927
Moreing Field -Sacramento, CA

1928-1931
Sacramento Stadium -East Sacramento, CA
Capacity (20,000)

The stadium opened in 1928 and was initially known as Sacramento Stadium and Sacramento College Stadium.  ITi s now known as Charles C. Hughes Stadium (commonly referred to as Hughes Stadium)

1932-1948
A Street Field -Davis, CA

1949-2006
Toomey Field -Yolo County, CA
 Capacity (12,800)

Toomey Field is located on the campus of the University of California, Davis in unincorporated Yolo County, California. The Woody Wilson Track is located in the stadium and it is home to the UC Davis Aggies track and field team.
At the northeast corner of campus, Aggie Field opened in 1949 and was home to the Aggies'  football team through 2006. The first game, on November 18, was a 12–3 victory over Chico State. The record for attendance at the stadium was set on November 12, 1977, with 12,800 for a 37–21 victory over Nevada.
The stadium was renamed in 1962 in honor of Crip Toomey, who served as athletic director at UC Davis from 1928 until his death in 1961. Toomey graduated from UC Davis in 1923 and also served as the Aggies' basketball coach and football coach from 1928 to 1936.

2007-current
UC Davis Health Stadium -Yolo County, CA
Capacity (10,743)

UC Davis Health Stadium is a 10,743-seat multi-purpose stadium located on the campus of the University of California, Davis. Opened as Aggie Stadium on April 1, 2007, it replaced Toomey Field and is the home to the UC Davis Aggies football and women's lacrosse teams. Plans call for the stadium to eventually be built out to 30,000 seats.

The artificial turf playing field is named Jim Sochor Field, after their College Football Hall of Fame coach.
It was known as Aggie Stadium from 2007- 2018. As part of a partnership with the UC Davis Health System, announced at the Causeway Classic Luncheon on November 15, 2018, the facility was renamed UC Davis Health Stadium on August 1, 2019, for a period of 20 years.
The previous venue, Toomey Field, continues as the home of the Aggies' track and field teams.
The Tavernetti Bell, also known as the "Victory Bell", greets fans entering Aggie Stadium. The bell is named after Thomas Tavernetti (1889–1934) and is rung once for every point scored after an Aggie victory. With the construction of Aggie Stadium, the bell followed from its previous location at Toomey Field.

Rivalries

Sacramento State

The Causeway Classic

The Sacramento State Hornets are the natural cross-town rival who battle UC Davis annually for the Causeway Trophy. This rivalry is known as the Causeway Classic. UC Davis leads the all-time series 46–23 with no ties as of 2022.

Cal Poly

Battle for the Golden Horseshoe

The Cal Poly Mustangs are another rival; these teams compete in the Battle for the Golden Horseshoe each year with the winner receiving a trophy of a large golden horseshoe. Both Sacramento State and Cal Poly are designated rivals for Big Sky Conference scheduling purposes, which means UC Davis plays both teams each year as part of its conference schedule. UC Davis leads the series 26-20-2 as of 2022.

Stanford

UC Davis also has a smaller rivalry with Stanford University following UC Davis' 20–17 upset of the Cardinal in 2005 while still a provisional Division I team.

Nevada
The Aggie-Pack Battle

UC Davis and Nevada have not played each other since 2013, but have a historical rivalry dating back to the first match up in 1915 when the University Farm School Aggies beat the Nevada Sagebrushers 14-0 in Carson City, Nevada. They have played each other 54 times since. The "Aggie-Pack" battle would regularly have old-fashioned rooters buses travel 146 miles (2.5 hours) down  I-80 for this rivalry that was regularly "a battle for West Coast small-college supremacy … in fact, the mid-November 1977 Nevada-UCD matchup drew 12,800 fans to Toomey Field, which still stands as a home attendance record … and yes, the crowd-pleasing Aggies prevailed, 37-21 …"  Nevada leads the series 29-21-3 as of 2022.

Chico State

A most heated Northern California small-college rivalry That started in 1922 with 69 meetings between the two schools until 1997 when Chico State  discontinued its football program. UC Davis won the series 46-20-3. Both programs were vying for Far Western Conference and Northern California Athletic Conference championships every year for decades. From 1970 to 1997  UC Davis and Chico State won or shared the FWC/NCAC Conference football title 25 of 27 times.

Humboldt State

The Humboldt State Lumberjacks and Aggies first met in 1935 in Eureka, CA and last met in 2011 and were rivals in the Far Western Conference and Northern California Athletic Conference and played each other 60 times. The Aggies won the series 41-16-3. Humboldt State discontinued their football program in 2018.

San Francisco State

The San Francisco State Gators and Aggies first met in 1937 in San Francisco, CA, a 13-7 win by the Northern Branch Cal Aggies and last met in 1994 just before San Francisco State discontinued their football program in 1995. The 'Staters'/'Golden Gaters'/'Gators' and Aggies were rivals in the Far Western Conference and Northern California Athletic Conference and played each other 51 times. The Aggies won the series 33-17-1. From 1954 to 1967 UC Davis and San Francisco State combined won 10 of 15 Far Western Conference titles.

Notable games
On November 14, 1971, UC Davis defeated Cal State Hayward 30–29, where UC Davis scored 16 points in the final 44 seconds and was dubbed the "Miracle Game". After scoring on a five-play drive that included a two-point conversion with 20 seconds remaining, UC Davis recovered an onside kick. On the final play of the game, quarterback and future UC Davis head coach Bob Biggs found tight end Mike Bellotti for a 29-yard touchdown on the final play of the game with four seconds remaining. Instead of tying the score with the extra point, head coach Jim Sochor went for the win and another two-point conversion. After two false starts, Biggs completed a pass to Mike Everly to complete the comeback.

The Aggies' defeated the Stanford Cardinal 20–17 on September 18, 2005, after trailing 17–0 midway through the second quarter. Stanford quarterback Trent Edwards then left the game with an injury. The Aggies scored 20 unanswered and became the first non-Division I-A/FBS team to defeat the Cardinal. The win was the Aggies' first over a Division I-A team since 1986 against the Pacific Tigers and was the first against a Pac-10 team in 65 years. It was also the second win over Stanford with the first taking place in 1932.

On October 4, 2008, Bakari Grant caught a 38-yard Hail Mary touchdown pass from Greg Denham against the Northern Colorado Bears to win 34–30. The game was dubbed the "Hail Bakari" at the time.

College Football Hall of Fame inductees
The Aggies have two coaches inducted into the College Football Hall of Fame, and one player.

Ken O'Brien, made Division II All-America in 1982. He led the 1982 UC Davis Aggies football team to a 10-0 record in the regular season. In the NCAA playoffs, the Aggies beat Northern Michigan 42-21 and North Dakota State 19-14 before losing in the championship game to Southwest Texas State 34-9.

Sochor became the head coach at UC Davis in 1970 after being an assistant coach since 1967. He had a streak of 18 consecutive conference championships, from 1971 to 1988 (15 outright, three shared). The only other college football program in NCAA history at any division level with a longer streak has been Mount Union College. His overall record between 1970 and 1988 was 156–41–5, a winning percentage of .785.  In conference games under Sochor, the UC Davis Aggies were 92–5. He had winning streaks of 41 and 38 in-conference games. His Aggies were the final poll leaders at the end of the regular season in 1983 and 1985.

He was named national coach of the year in NCAA Division II in 1983. He was also a mentor to several future head coaches including Dan Hawkins, Paul Hackett, Mike Bellotti, Chris Petersen, Gary Patterson, and Bob Biggs.

Sochor led the Aggies to 3 of their 5 Bowl games, the  1982 Palm Bowl in McAllen, Texas for the NCAA Division II national football championship against the Jim Wacker-led Southwest Texas State, 1977 Knute Rockne Bowl for the 1977 NCAA Division II football season semifinal, and the 1972 Boardwalk Bowl. He also lead them to the 1983 Division II Semifinal.

In 1973, Mike Bellotti started his career in football coaching at his alma mater as an assistant coach under College Football Hall of Fame coach Jim Sochor.

National Award Winner

Eddie Robinson Award

The Eddie Robinson Award is awarded annually to college football's top head coach in the NCAA Division I Football Championship Subdivision (formerly Division I-AA). It was established in 1987.

AFCA Assistant Coach of the Year

National Football Foundation Scholar-Athlete of the Year Award

Notable players

Nick Aliotti, college coach
Jeff Allen, NFL defensive back
Scott Barry, NFL quarterback
Rolf Benirschke, NFL placekicker and TV host
Bob Biggs, CFL quarterback and college coach
Mike Bellotti, college coach and analyst
Chris Carter, NFL wide receiver
Kevin Daft, NFL quarterback and college coach
Keelan Doss, NFL wide receiver
Bo Eason, NFL defensive back (second-round draft pick) and actor
Daniel Fells, NFL tight end
Bob Foster, college coach
Bakari Grant, CFL wide receiver
Mark Grieb, AFL quarterback and college coach
Nathaniel Hackett, college and NFL coach
Paul Hackett, college and NFL coach
Dan Hawkins, college coach, current UC Davis head coach
Khari Jones, CFL quarterback and coach
Joshua Kelley, NFL running back (later transferred to UCLA)
Tim Lajcik, mixed martial artist
Bryan Lee-Lauduski, Arena Football League player
Chris Mandeville, NFL defensive back
Rich Martini, NFL wide receiver
Casey Merrill, NFL defensive end
Mike Moroski, first NFL player from UC Davis, playing as quarterback. Also a college coach
Ken O'Brien, NFL quarterback (first-round draft pick)
J. T. O'Sullivan, NFL quarterback
Michael Oliva, NFL wide receiver
Chris Petersen, college coach
Colton Schmidt, NFL/AAF/XFL punter
John Shoemaker, NFL wide receiver
Elliot Vallejo, NFL offensive tackle 
Forest Vance, NFL offensive tackle and personal trainer
Colby Wadman, NFL punter
Tom Williams, NFL defensive end
Mike Wise, NFL defensive end

References

External links
 

 
American football teams established in 1915
1915 establishments in California